

See also
 Atlas Mountains

Morocco
Mountains
Morocco